Desktop wars may refer to:

 The struggle for dominance of the desktop computer market from the mid-1980s to mid-1990s between Apple's classic Mac OS, Microsoft's Windows (DOS-based) and IBM's OS/2.
 The debate among Linux users and developers as to which Linux desktop environment is best; generally, the wars are fought over KDE and GNOME, although alternatives such as Xfce are tossed in the mix. For the most part, it is friendly competition between the two, but occasionally, there have been cases in which aspects of the development of desktop environments have been criticised, such as by Linus Torvalds.

See also 
Desktop Linux
Software wars

References 

Software wars
Linux